American New Zealanders are New Zealand citizens who are of American descent of American-born citizens from the United States. American New Zealanders constitute a small minority of New Zealand's population.

Demography
In the 2013 census in New Zealand, when asked to indicate their ethnic identity, 12,342 New Zealanders described themselves as "American", and 21,462 stated they were born in the United States. This marks a sizeable increase, in proportional terms, from the 8,451 US-born New Zealanders in 1991. In 2013, there were also 636 persons born in American Samoa and living in New Zealand, and small numbers of persons born in other US territories.

American ethnicity 
There were 16,245 people identifying as being part of the American ethnic group at the 2018 New Zealand census, making up 0.35% of New Zealand's population. This is an increase of 3,903 people (31.6%) since the 2013 census, and an increase of 5,439 people (50.3%) since the 2006 census. Some of the increase between the 2013 and 2018 census was due to Statistics New Zealand adding ethnicity data from other sources (previous censuses, administrative data, and imputation) to the 2018 census data to reduce the number of non-responses.

There were 7,269 males and 8,979 females, giving a sex ratio of 0.810 males per female. Of the population, 3,153 people (19.4%) were aged under 15 years, 3,579 (22.0%) were 15 to 29, 8,049 (49.5%) were 30 to 64, and 1,467 (9.0%) were 65 or older.

In terms of population distribution, 73.7% of American New Zealanders live in the North Island and 26.3% live in the South Island. Waiheke Island has the highest concentration of American people at 1.1%, followed by the Queenstown-Lakes District (1.0%), Wellington City and the Waitematā local board area of Auckland (both 0.9%). The Chatham Islands was the only area to record zero American people.

United States birthplace 
There were 27,678 people in New Zealand born in the United States at the 2018 New Zealand census. This is an increase of 6,213 people (28.9%) since the 2013 census, and an increase of 9,930 people (55.9%) since the 2006 census. 

There were 12,849 males and 14,832 females, giving a sex ratio of 0.866 males per female. Of the population, 3,537 people (12.8%) were aged under 15 years, 6,633 (24.0%) were 15 to 29, 14,016 (50.6%) were 30 to 64, and 3,495 (12.6%) were 65 or older.

Community history
Americans began visiting New Zealand at the very end of the 18th century. These settled the nation as discharged British soldiers and sailors, as convicts (who were arrested at sea for maritime offenses, tried, and transported), and as whalers, sealers, or travelers. Many of these who were brought to New Zealand had a temporary stay and were returned and/or brought to New South Wales in neighboring Australia. In 1839, there were about 50 Americans living in New Zealand, constituting about 4% of the non-Māori population of the country's North Island. That number increased to 306 in 1858, 720 in 1861, and 1,213 in 1871, an increase due primarily to a gold rush in Otago. Subsequently, there were only 881 Americans living in New Zealand in 1901, their numbers then increased to 1,713 in 1951, 8,383 in 1976, and 13,347 in 2001.

Between 1942 and 1944, during the Second World War, about 100,000 US troops were stationed in New Zealand. They exercised a notable influence on the country's way of life, and a small number settled in New Zealand. Immigration rates from the United States remained low until the 1960s, however. A "surge" of US immigrants was noted in the 1960s, 1970s, and again from the mid-1990s. Some of these came as New Zealand recruited foreign teachers to meet with local shortages.

One example in recent history of American New Zealanders forming community is around the Olympic games. The New Zealand Atlanta Association formed out of the 1996 Olympic games and held New Zealand/US bicultural events including celebrating Anzac Day and Waitangi day for years after the games. The group maintains an active social media presence.

Notable people

See also
African New Zealanders
American Australians
European New Zealanders
Europeans in Oceania
Immigration to New Zealand
New Zealand Americans

References

American diaspora
Ethnic groups in New Zealand
New Zealand people of American descent
American emigration